is a Japanese free-to-play role-playing video game developed and published by f4Samurai and Sega. It was released in Japan in April 2015 for Android and iOS devices. An anime television series adaptation by Liden Films aired from January to March 2021.

Characters

The protagonist is the main player-controlled character of Hortensia Saga. He is named Alfred Albert in the anime series.

A young boy who was rescued by Maurice after the rebellion that took his parents' lives. He has trained for years alongside Alfred and becomes his squire. Secretly, Marius is Princess , hiding under Maurice to keep her out of the sights of Camellia.

A Knight Templar of Hortensia who lost his right eye during the rebellion, but managed to escape the capital with Fernando's sword and a boy named Marius. He spends a few years training both Alfred and Marius to defend themselves.

A maid serving the Albert household.

A small winged talking mammal who ends all his sentences with "moru."

A womanizing spearman with a small bounty on his head who fled his village at an early age, only to find it overrun by zombies when he returned years later. He joins Alfred's party after they help save what is left of his home from the Church.

A Knight Templar of Hortensia who wields a spear in combat. The heir to the Olivier Dominion after her father died, she is forced to run a vassal state under the eyes of the Church, but secretly continues searching for the missing Princess Mariel.

The leader of the Olivier Dominion and Adelheid's father who died while protecting the King of Hortensia during Camellia's rebellion.

A Knight Templar of Hortensia who gave his life to drive out Duke Rugis from the castle during the rebellion. His sword was passed down to his son, Alfred.

The Duke of Camellia who makes a pact with dark powers to rebel against Hortensia and take control for himself. He can transform into a giant werewolf.

A master archer who serves under Rugis, he wields a custom-made bow that allows him to defend himself at close range as well as shoot down targets from afar.

A senior Knight Templar of Hortensia forced to work with the Church after the Pope uses Charlot to give the Church's own knights authority over the Knights Templar.

A pair of young Dayerehan twins who wield dark magic and can summon some monsters.

A young boy who was crowned King of Hortensia after his father died and his older sister, the Princess, went missing during the rebellion. Currently used as a puppet ruler under the Pope.

Media

Manga
A manga adaptation illustrated by Pon Jea and Seiji began serialization in Media Factory's seinen manga magazine Monthly Comic Alive on March 27, 2020.

Volume list

Anime
An anime television series adaptation by Liden Films was announced on December 28, 2019. The series was directed by Yasuto Nishikata and written by Rintarō Ikeda, with character designs by Takayuki Onoda and music by Zenta. It aired from January 7 to March 25, 2021. The opening theme is "LEADER" performed by MY FIRST STORY. Mafumafu performed the first ending theme  from Episodes 1–7 and 9–12, while Yui Horie performed the second ending theme "VEIL" for Episode 8 as her character Mariel D'Hortensia.

Funimation licensed the series and streamed it on its website in North America and the British Isles, in Europe through Wakanim, and in Australia and New Zealand through AnimeLab. On October 29, 2021, Funimation announced the series would receive an English dub, which premiered the following day. Following Sony's acquisition of Crunchyroll, the series was moved to Crunchyroll. In Southeast Asia, Muse Communication has licensed the series and streamed it on Bilibili.

Episode list

Notes

References

External links

Anime official website 

2015 video games
2021 anime television series debuts
Android (operating system) games
Anime television series based on video games
Aniplex
Crunchyroll anime
Fantasy video games
Free-to-play video games
Gacha games
IOS games
Japan-exclusive video games
Japanese role-playing video games
Liden Films
Manga based on video games
Media Factory manga
Muse Communication
Sega video games
Seinen manga
Tokyo MX original programming
Video games developed in Japan